Liberation News Service (LNS) was a New Left, anti-war underground press news agency that distributed news bulletins and photographs to hundreds of subscribing underground, alternative and radical newspapers from 1967 to 1981. Considered the "Associated Press" for the underground press, at its zenith the LNS served more than 500 papers. Founded in Washington, D.C., it operated out of New York City for most of its existence.

Overview 
According to former LNS staffers Thorne Dreyer and Victoria Smith, the Liberation News Service "was an attempt at a new kind of journalism — developing a more personalistic style of reporting, questioning bourgeois conceptions of 'objectivity' and reevaluating established notions about the nature of news..." They pointed out that LNS "provided coverage of events to which most papers would have otherwise had no access, and... put these events into a context, helping new papers in their attempts to develop a political analysis... In many places, where few radicals exist and journalistic experience is lacking, papers have been made possible primarily because LNS copy has been available to supplement scarce local material." The total combined circulation of the LNS-member papers was conservatively estimated at 2 million.

History

Foundation 
Liberation News Service was founded in the summer of 1967 by Ray Mungo and Marshall Bloom after they were separated from the United States Student Press Association and its Collegiate Press Service. Operating out of a townhouse at 3 Thomas Circle which they shared with the Washington Free Press, the LNS soon released its inaugural mimeographed news packet. 

With support from private donors and assistance from the nearby Institute for Policy Studies, they were soon joined by other young journalists, including Allen Young, Marty Jezer and photographer David Fenton, sending out packets of articles and photographs on a twice-weekly schedule to underground newspapers across the U.S. and abroad.

Expansion 
During this time the writings of Thorne Webb Dreyer — co-founder of the Austin, Texas, underground paper The Rag — were widely distributed, appearing regularly in dozens of periodicals. Dreyer's coverage of the October 21, 1967, March on the Pentagon – with its massive acts of civil disobedience – was distributed by LNS and published around the world. The night before the march, Bloom, Mungo, and the other staffers convened a chaotic meeting in a Washington loft with underground press editors from around the country who were in town to cover the event; but they failed to reach an agreement to create a democratic structure in which LNS would be owned and run by its member papers. 

Operating on their own with a volunteer staff of 12, Bloom and Mungo moved forward with ambitious plans for the expansion of LNS. In December 1967 they opened an international Telex line to Oxford, England; and later that winter LNS merged with the Student Communications Network (SCN), based in Berkeley, California, which had its own nationwide Telex network with terminals in Berkeley, Los Angeles, New York, Ann Arbor, Ames, Iowa, Chicago, and Philadelphia, leased from Western Union. The Student Communications Network was a project of the University Christian Movement, a liberal Protestant church organization described as "mostly concerned with political and social issues rather than Christian evangelization."

Opening of the New York office 
By February 1968, LNS was becoming the hub for alternative journalism in the United States, supplying the growing movement media with interpretive coverage of current events and reports on movement activities and the Sixties counterculture. There were 150 underground papers and 90 college papers subscribing to LNS, with most subscribers paying (or at least being billed) $180 a year. 

LNS took over the former SCN office in New York, which had just been opened by former Columbia University graduate student George Cavalletto and others in a converted Chinese restaurant on Claremont Avenue in Harlem. Walking by, Steve Diamond saw a brand new Telex machine sitting in an otherwise empty storefront and a sign seeking volunteers, and attended a meeting shortly afterward at which the New York staff was formed. 

Around this time, Rag co-founder Thorne Dreyer left Austin to help build LNS' editorial collective in New York City. 

Two months after it opened, the New York office became a central focus for LNS activity during the Columbia University student uprising in April 1968, as a continual stream of bulletins going out over the Telex kept underground papers and radio stations across the country up-to-the-minute on the latest developments in the Columbia student strike. To young radicals across the country, it seemed as if the revolution had come.

Moving the headquarters to New York 
Recognizing that New York was where the action was and running short on funds, Bloom and Mungo decided to relocate the national headquarters from the expensive townhouse office in D.C. to the large storefront space in New York, which Cavalletto was renting for only $200 a month. Bringing Allen Young, Harvey Wasserman, Verandah Porche, and some of the other Washington staff with them, along with Sheila Ryan of the Washington Free Press, they moved into the New York office. 

A culture clash soon developed, however, between the headquarters staff and the already existing local staff in New York, which had been originally recruited by the Student Communications Network, and who had been running their own affairs up to that point. Over the summer the staff divided into warring cliques polarized between Bloom and Mungo, who controlled the board of directors, and Cavalletto, who held the lease on the office and was paying the rent. The Bloom/Mungo group was repeatedly outvoted in staff votes by the locals, who outnumbered them; only Steve Diamond of the New York group sided with the outsiders.

Montague farm fight 
In August 1968, a successful fundraising event led to an ugly fight over control of the organization's funds, with an angry posse of LNSers trailing Bloom, Mungo, and Diamond to Massachusetts where they had used the $6,000 cash from the fundraiser to make the down payment on a farm in Montague which was to be the new headquarters of LNS. 

A tense six-hour standoff at the farm ended with Bloom writing a check to Cavalletto, but after the New York group left, Bloom filed kidnapping charges against 13 people, including Cavalletto, Ryan, Dreyer, and Victoria Smith. The charges were later dismissed. 

For the next six months LNS subscribers received rival news packets from LNS-Montague and LNS-New York, but the Montague group was understaffed, underfunded, and isolated on a remote (and cold) country farm. Only the New York headquarters group survived the split, with Young becoming a recognized leader.

Bloom committed suicide the following year. A pro-Montague account of the split appears in Mungo's book Famous Long Ago: My Life and Hard Times with the Liberation News Service.

Reformation as a collective 
Now under the control of a collective, for several years LNS was produced from Morningside Heights in Manhattan, initially from the Claremont Avenue storefront, and later from the basement of an apartment building which at one time had been a food store.

The subscriber base grew to over 500 papers, and a high school underground press service, run by local high school students, was added. Allen Young estimates that something like 200 staffers worked at LNS over the years, "usually with 8-20 full-time participants or staff at any one time."

By 1972, LNS was garnering support from well-known journalists and activists, as documented in a letter signed by I.F. Stone, Jack Newfield, Nat Hentoff, and William M. Kunstler published in the New York Review of Books. In an appeal for funds, the signers praised the investigative work of LNS, noting that it had "grown from a mimeoed sheet distributed to ten newspapers to a printed 20-page packet of articles and graphics mailed to nearly 800 subscribers twice a week." 

In 1969 LNS published a long essay co-authored by Thorne Dreyer and Victoria Smith, titled "The Movement and the New Media," which was considered to be the first serious journalistic portrait of the increasingly powerful underground press phenomenon. Dreyer also wrote extensively about the growing repression of underground papers throughout the country.

Dissolution 
Throughout the 1970s, with the end of the Vietnam War and the decline of the New Left, LNS dwindled along with the rapidly disappearing underground press. Reduced to serving only 150 newspapers, the LNS collective decided to close operations in August 1981.

Archives 
LNS records are archived variously in the Contemporary Culture Collection of Temple University Libraries, the Archive of Social Change of the University of Massachusetts Amherst Library, Interference Archive, and the Archives & Special Collections at Amherst College; its photographs are archived at New York University's Tamiment Library.

See also

Alternative news agency
 List of underground newspapers of the 1960s counterculture

Notes

Further reading

Armstrong, David.  A Trumpet to Arms: Alternative Media in America (Boston: South End Press, 1981), pp. 105–107.  
Wachsberger, Ken, ed. Voices from the Underground: Insider Histories of the Vietnam Era Underground Press (Incredible Librarian Books, 1993)     Azenphony Press

External links
Liberation News Service archive
LNS packet #197 (Sept. 25, 1969) at the Liberation News Service archive
LNS photograph collection at Tamiment Library
LNS records, 1969–1981, at the Contemporary Culture Collection of Temple University Libraries.
Liberation News Service (Famous Long Ago Archives) at the University of Massachusetts Amherst Library Archive of Social Change
Marshall Bloom (AC 1966) Alternative Press Collection at the Amherst College Archives & Special Collections
Marshall Bloom Papers at the Amherst College Archives & Special Collections
David Kerr Research Materials on Liberation News Service and the Alternative Press at the Amherst College Archives & Special Collections

Alternative weekly newspapers published in the United States
News agencies based in the United States
Opposition to United States involvement in the Vietnam War
Counterculture of the 1960s